Auchenaspis salteri  is an extinct species of armored jawless fish of the order Thyestiida from the Late Silurian of England. In England, A. salteri's fossils are found in extreme abundance in the Lower Old Red Sandstone strata in Ledbury, Herefordshire.

A. salteri strongly resembles the thyestiids Procephalaspis and Thyestes, and within Thyestiida, it represents a transitional form between the primitive, superficially Cephalaspis-like forms, such as Thyestes, and the more specialized tremataspid thyestiids, like Tremataspis, Dartmuthia, or Dobraspis, whose headshields tend to resemble hot buns or horseshoe crabs.

References

Osteostraci genera
Silurian fish of Europe
Fossils of Great Britain